Clarkston is a city in DeKalb County, Georgia, United States. The population was 7,554 as of the 2010 census. 

The city is noted for its ethnic diversity, and is often referred to as "the most diverse square mile in America" and "the Ellis Island of the South." In the 1990s, refugee resettlement programs identified Clarkston as a good fit for displaced persons of many backgrounds. The rental market was open, residents were moving farther out from the Atlanta urban core, and Clarkston was the last stop on a transit line into the city. At present students attending Clarkston High School come from over 50 countries; the local mosque (Masjid al-Momineen, or Mosque of the Faithful in English) has a diverse and sizable congregation; and over half the population is estimated by some to be foreign born.

History
A post office called Clarkston has been in operation since 1876. The Georgia General Assembly incorporated the place in 1882 as the "Town of Clarkston", with municipal corporate limits extending in a one-half mile radius from the Georgia Railroad depot. The community was named after W. W. Clark, a railroad official.

Geography 

Clarkston is located at  (33.810304, −84.239877).

Clarkston is on the Eastern Continental Divide.

Government 
City Council
Beverly H. Burks, Mayor 
Awet Eyasu, Vice Mayor
Jamie Carroll
Ahmed Hassan
Laura Hopkins
Debra D. Johnson

Transportation

Major roads

Mass transit 

 MARTA Bus 120 connects to MARTA Blue Line rail service at Avondale
 MARTA Bus 125 connects to MARTA Blue Line rail service at Kensington

Pedestrians and cycling

Stone Mountain Trail

Demographics

2020 census

As of the 2020 United States census, there were 14,756 people, 3,727 households, and 2,341 families residing in the city.

2010 census
As of 2010 Clarkston had a population of 7,554.  The racial and ethnic composition of the population was 13.6% white (13.1% non-Hispanic white), 58.4% black or African American (57.9% non-Hispanic black), 0.2% Native American, 21.6 Asian (4.8% Vietnamese, 16.8% other Asian), 2.1% from some other race and 4.1% from two or more races.  2.8% of the population was Hispanic or Latino of any race.

2000 census
As of the census of 2000, there were 7,231 people, 2,469 households, and 1,587 families residing in the city. The racial makeup of the city was 19.44% White, 55.66% African American, 0.11% Native American, 12.57% Asian, 0.04% Pacific Islander, 2.56% from other races, and 9.61% from two or more races. Hispanic or Latino of any race were 4.61% of the population.

In 2000, Clarkston foreign residents included African (4%), Arab (1%), West Indian (1%), Asian Indian (1%), Other Hispanic or Latino (1%), and Central American (1%) immigrants.

There were 2,469 households, out of which 38.9% had children under the age of 18 living with them, 34.2% were married couples living together, 21.4% had a female householder with no husband present, and 35.7% were non-families. 22.8% of all households were made up of individuals, and 2.5% had someone living alone who was 65 years of age or older.  The average household size was 2.92 and the average family size was 3.54.

In the city, the population was spread out, with 30.0% under the age of 18, 12.9% from 18 to 24, 40.0% from 25 to 44, 13.4% from 45 to 64, and 3.7% who were 65 years of age or older.  The median age was 28 years. For every 100 females, there were 103.7 males.  For every 100 females age 18 and over, there were 99.3 males.

The median income for a household in the city was $37,436, and the median income for a family was $38,056. Males had a median income of $27,604 versus $25,000 for females. The per capita income for the city was $14,304.  About 19.5% of families and 19.3% of the population were below the poverty line, including 21.0% of those under age 18 and 6.7% of those age 65 or over.

Education 
DeKalb County School System operates Clarkston's public schools.

 Indian Creek Elementary School
 Jolly Elementary School
 Freedom Middle School 
 Clarkston High School

All the schools are located outside of the city limits of Clarkston.

Atlanta Area School for the Deaf is a State funded school in Clarkston.

The Clarkston Campus of Georgia State University's Perimeter College is just south of the city limits.
Georgia Piedmont Technical College, part of the Technical College System of Georgia, is in Clarkston.

Public libraries
DeKalb County Public Library operates the Clarkston Branch.

Refugee resettlement 
Georgia is among states that receive the highest amount of refugees for resettlement, and has resettled more than 37,000 refugees since 1993. Clarkston receives a large portion of these refugees, but arrivals have gradually declined yearly since 2016. In 2016, then Georgia Governor Nathan Deal issued and then reneged on an executive order attempting to cease influx of Syrian refugees into the state. Additionally, as of 2019 federal funding for refugee programs has decreased and executive orders have been issued that allow states increased authority to limit resettlement, which has resulted in the downsizing of several Georgia resettlement organizations.

Organizations that aid the resettlement of refugees in Clarkston include:

 Friends of Refugees
 Fugees Family
 International Rescue Committee of Atlanta
 New American Pathways
 World Relief Atlanta

In popular culture

In television 

 Clarkston is the setting of the episode "Make Ted Great Again" in the second season of Queer Eye in 2018.
 Clarkston is featured in the episode "It's a Greens Thing" in the first season of Vivan Howard's PBS cooking show Somewhere South in 2020.

References

External links

City of Clarkston official website
 Clarkston GA News

Africans in the United States
Clarkston
Cities in DeKalb County, Georgia
Cities in Georgia (U.S. state)
Refugees in the United States